Louis Kotra Uregei (4 February 1951 – 20 October 2022) was a New Caledonian syndicalist and politician. 

Uregei was born in Nouméa on 4 February 1951. He was a member of the Labour Party, and was a Kanak who supported independence from France. 

Uregei died on 20 October 2022, at the age of 71.

References

1951 births
2022 deaths
Kanak people
New Caledonia politicians
Members of the Congress of New Caledonia
People from Nouméa